Viktor Budantsev (born 21 January 1961) is a Belarusian sailor. He competed at the 1988 Summer Olympics, the 1992 Summer Olympics, and the 1996 Summer Olympics.

References

External links
 
 

1961 births
Living people
Belarusian male sailors (sport)
Soviet male sailors (sport)
Olympic sailors of the Soviet Union
Olympic sailors of the Unified Team
Olympic sailors of Belarus
Sailors at the 1988 Summer Olympics – Flying Dutchman
Sailors at the 1992 Summer Olympics – Flying Dutchman
Sailors at the 1996 Summer Olympics – Tornado
People from Artik